Senator Purviance may refer to:

David Purviance (1766–1847), Ohio State Senate
Samuel D. Purviance (1774–1806), North Carolina State Senate